Beacon is a cold-hardy cultivar of apple developed by University of Minnesota in 1936. It is a cross between 'Wealthy' and 'Malinda' apples. This apple is medium in size with full, deep red stripes. Its flesh is pulpy and fairly soft, with a mildy sweet flavor. This apple is good for cooking and eating (when fresh).

See also
'Haralson' - a cultivar that is assumed to be of the same parentage

External links
 Beacon at Orange Pippin website
 Minnesota Harvest
 Apple Journal

American apples
University of Minnesota
Minnesota University breeds
Apple cultivars